St. Mary’s School Yala is a Roman Catholic primary and secondary school for boys located on the Kisumu-Busia highway in Yala Township in the Nyanza Province of Western Kenya.

Founded in 1927 by the Mill Hill missionaries notably Msgr. Brandsma who wanted to start a teachers college for catholic schools, the school opened its doors  in 1927 making it one of the oldest schools in Kenya.

The school eventually evolved to become a full primary school and junior secondary school that expanded to become the current St. Mary’s Yala. Approximately 2000 students attend the school each year and has a teaching staff of 40. The school follows the Kenyan 8-4-4 education system.

History 
St. Mary's School Yala was a by-product of increased missionary activity by the Mill Hill Missionaries in Kenya in the early 1900s when Monsignor Brandsma (1874-1935) and a group of Mill Hill missionaries from There Netherlands whose vision to expand catholic education and counter Anglican and other Protestant missions already developed in Kenya. Brandsma succeeded in obtaining land from the then local Chief Odera Okang'o. Initially intended to be a teacher training institution, the school opened its doors to its first batch of students in 1927 and was upgraded to "A" level in 1957.  The school played an important role in the spread of Christianity and education development in post-colonial Kenya alongside Maseno School, Kabaa High School Alliance High School.

Student life

The student body is headed by the Chairman of the student leadership council. The position is currently held by Nobert Okoth(2021/22) succeeding Allan Rodgers (2020/2021) (Head Boy) together with secretaries (Secretary General, Secretary of Academics, Housing and catering, Students Welfare, Environment and Organizing Secretary) and Councillors.

There are a total of 16 dormitories named after founders and prominent alumni of the school. These are divided into zones i.e.

 Northern zone's dormitories include: Stam House, Kennedy House, Brandsma House.
 Central zone's dormitories include: Farmar/Tom Mboya, Annex and Hall House.
 Eastern zone's dormitories (Prof. George Magoha Territory) include Bouma, Kodhek<Rugambwa, K'Ojwang', Ollando and Awiti .
 Southern zone's dormitories include: Lambert, Grace Ogot and Lwanga.

Co-curriculum activities

The school offers various sporting disciplines, which include rugby, athletics, soccer, basketball, handball, indoor-games, volleyball, badminton and field hockey. The rugby team won the national secondary school rugby championship in 2003 and came in Third Place in 2017 and was able to proceed to Uganda for the EA championship.  The school is also a  strong performer in drama and music with consistent top placement of its drama and music club compositions in festivals, students feted for the best stand up comedy in the 2015 edition of the competition.

Administrative structure
The school was headed by  Mr. Agoya 1970, Mr. J.B. Juma 1978, Mr. N. Arega 1981, Mr. P. Odwuor, 1983
Mr Joseph Owuor till 1985, Mr. John Were 1987. Marcellous K’ojwang 1996, Mr. John Awiti 2005 and Mr. Bonaventure O. Ollando 2016. 
Deputy principals included Mr. M. Gweno 1991, Mr. Marcelus Kojwang 1995, Mr. Jephaniah Wabomba 1996, Mr. Bonaventure Ollando, 1999, Mrs. Rosemary Abuodha Omogo (Deputy Principal) 2006, Mr. Sammy Onyango took over as deputy Principal followed by Mr. Peter Auma 2010, Mr. Denis Oyako 2014, Mr. Nashon Sianga Adero, 2015, Mr. Nicholas Onyango 2017.
Mr Awiti, the former chairman and later secretary-general of Kenya Secondary School Heads Association (KESSHA) retired in 2016 and was replaced by Mr. Bonaventure Ollando (Yala, 86) who is also an alumnus of the school.

Facilities

The school undertook a lot of new projects and renovations during Awiti’s reign thus giving it a new facelift.  New pavements connecting classes, labs and dormitories were laid. Beautiful landscaping around the assembly area was done besides the purchase of a new school bus, setting up departmental offices, the water project, a sick bay for the students and a laboratory named Yoba House, renovation of all the dormitories and renovation of staff houses . Current on-going projects include Construction of a new dormitory with a capacity of 900 students. The school has been upgraded to a six streams with over 880 students. The school is equipped with a library, which offers a range of reference books, periodicals and university prospectuses.

The school has 22 classrooms, 13 dormitories, administrative offices and research labs. A private guidance and counseling office is also available as well as computer rooms.

Alumni of St Mary’s School Yala

Prominent Kenyan politicians 
1.	Tom Mboya, 
2.	Lawyer Argwings Kodhek, 
3.	Richard Onyonka, 
4.	Joseph Oloo Aringo - former Alego Usonga MP, 
5.	Ambassador Maurice Omuony Otieno
6.	Professor Ouma Muga, 
7.	Dr. Arthur Adhu Awiti, 
8.	Dr. Mukhisa Kituyi 
9.	Prof. John Lonyangapuo senator of West Pokot. 

Academicians:
1.	Prof Ouma Muga, 
2.	Prof. Henry Odera Oruka
3.	Prof. John Odhiambo of Strathmore,
4.	Prof Vincent Onyango of Strathmore, 
5.	Prof. Peter Owoko k’obonyo University of Nairobi, 
6.	Prof. Peter Odera of Masinde Muliro University, 
7.	Prof. Japheth O. Onyando of Egerton University,
8.	Prof. Aloys Alex Odeck Ayungo (Maseno University).  
9.	Prof. Gregory Maloba of Uganda, 
10.	Prof Isaiah Omolo Ndiege
11.	Prof. John Lonyangapuo 
12.	Prof. Dennis Ochuodho of Jaramogi Oginga Odinga University of Science and Technology,
13.	Prof Charles Owuor Olungah -University of Nairobi
14.	Prof Daniel Ochieng Orwenjo of Technical University of Kenya and 
15.	Dr. John B. Awuor University of Nairobi, 
16.	Dr Julius Jwan Director of Kenya Institute of Curriculum Development (KICD), 
17.	Dr. John Onam Onyatta, - University of Nairobi,
18.	Dr. Tom Mboya Olali - University of Nairobi,  
19.	Dr. David Okello Otieno -Kenyatta University, 
20.	Dr. Otieno Ong'ayo (Antony) (International Institute of Social Studies of Erasmus University
21.	Dr. Tom Odhiambo Ouna – Karatina University 
22.	Dr. Fredrick Z. A. Odede of Jaramogi Oginga Odinga University of Science and Technology (JOOUST), 
23.	Dr. Edwins Baraza Jaramogi Oginga Odinga University of Science and Technology (JOOUST), 
24.	Dr. George Ooko Abong’ University of Nairobi (UoN), 
25.	Dr. Dennis Obonyo Ndolo (ICGED), 
26.	Dr. Steve Ger (ICIPE) 
27.	Dr. Maurice Msanya, 
28.	Dr. Fredrick Odhiambo Osowo
29.	Dr Awuor Ponge of Africa Policy Centre (APC). 

Medical doctors
1.	Dr Alex Awiti (Chief Radiologist)
2.	Dr. Samson Gwer, 
3.	Dr John Paul Oyore, 
4.	Dr. Patrick Apopa (University of Arkansas, 
5.	Prof. Joachim Osur Vice Chancellor of Amref International University, 
6.	Dr. Spala Ohaga (Kisumu), 
7.	Dr.John Mumia Natala (Senior Doctor and Dentist Nyanza) 
8.	Dr. Bonaventure Aman, 

Judges
1.	Justice Masime, 
2.	Justice George Odunga, 
3.	Justice Fred Radido, 
4.	Justice Emmanuel O'kubasu, 
5.	Judge Dalmas Omondi Ohungo, 

Lawyers:
1.	Blaise Odhiambo (New York), 
2.	Dismas Wakla (Nairobi),
3.	Amos Wandago (Nairobi), 
4.	Gabriel Otiende (Nairobi), 
5.	Odhiambo Olel (Kisumu), 
6.	Aluoch Kopot (Kisumu), 
7.	Francis Nyaithe Onyango (Ugunja) 
8.	Lawyer Victor Olewe (Nairobi). 

Prominent Kenya government officials:
1.	Former PC Paul Olando, 
2.	Austine Dieto, Assistant County Commissioner, 
3.	Stanslas Oduor, Former PS Youth Ministry in the government of Kenya, 
4.	James Waweru, 
5.	George Chiaji – Roads Engineer Kenya Rural Roads Authority
6.	Mr. Enos Oyaya, Director, Quality Assurance and Standards, Ministry of Education, 
7.	Maurice Oray KRA commissioner 
8.	Vincent Oluoch – Director Survey
9.	Vincent Okoth – Director Agriculture 
10.	Joseph Omondi Ochieng a Major at KDF.
11.	Dan Odhiambo Orwa – Ministry ofAgriculture

Technology: 
1.	Peter Othino of Telkom Kenya, 
2.	Barrack Otieno - Africa GM at Aftld, 
3.	Emmanuel Khisa a Fintech guru, Donald Mwanga- German based Tech Consultant, 
4.	Engineer Wycliffe Baraza, 
5.	Engineer George Ònyancha of Kenya Power, 
6.	David Ngesa a Data Scientist 
7.	Dennis Abuya an IT  Premium Strategies,
8.	Peter Owenje of IBM,
9.	Jacktone Oduor Onyango, David Obor of CDC KEMRI) 

Prominent Saints in industries 
1.	CEO Victor Orenge Masea
2.	George Odenyo Finance Director at Eaton, 
3.	Steven Norberts Ochieng Partner at PWC, 
4.	Buxton Ogutu of Deloitte. 
5.	Jack Onyando, a Health Systems Specialist with the United Nations,
6.	George Onyango General Manager at GSK, 
7.	Dr. Edwine Ochieng Executive Director Move on Afrika consulting Ltd. 
8.	Walter Andaro – Marketing Manager – MS Oils
9.	Tom Arody, an HRM Professional 
10.	David Bolo – Manager – Davis and Shirtliff
11.	David Odongo, a senior journalist with The Standard Group Limited 
12.	Kevin Onyango Ochola of Kvoch research 
13.	Engineer Martin Otieno Ogada of UNILEVER KENYA LTD, 

Prominent Saints in the UN and NGOs
1.	David Otieno Muyai of UNDP, New York
2. Jack Onyando of UNICEF,Kenya.
3.	Thoimas Opiyo -CountryDirector – Living Goods 
4.	Fred Opundo Monitoring & Verification Manager at SOCHA/MSP/USAID,
5. Dr.  Phebeans Oriaro Country Director, Kenya, at Innovations for Poverty Action,
6.	Emmanuel Nyabera of The UN High Commissioner for Refugees (UNHCR) 
7.	Peter Oruka - international relations practitioner

Saints heading schools
1.	Mr Bonaventure  Olando
2.	Mr Edward  Okecth
3.	Mr Magero Amonde
4.	David Otieno Opela

Saints  in spirituality 
1.	Fr. Fredrcik Ogambi – Kisumu Diocese
2.	Fr. James Awuor Kisero – Kisumu Diocese

References

External links
YOBA

 
1927 establishments in Kenya